"A la nanita nana" is a traditional Christmas time carol sung in honor of Baby Jesus, that has since become a popular lullaby in the Hispanic world.

Origin 
The composer of the song for voice and piano La nana, balada al Niño Jesús was José Ramón Gomis,  born in 1856 in Novelda, Alicante, Spain; the lyrics were written by Juan Francisco Muñoz y Pabón. The score was published in 1904.

The Cheetah Girls version 
In 2006, a shortened version of the song was recorded by The Cheetah Girls (Raven-Symoné, Adrienne Bailon, Sabrina Bryan and Kiely Williams) accompanied by Mexican singer Belinda for the soundtrack album The Cheetah Girls 2, for the film of the same name, whose interpretation also appears in the film.

See also
The Cheetah Girls (band)
Christian child's prayer
List of Christmas carols

References

External links 
 A La Nanita Nana - An incredibly beautiful song
 Lyrics and music
 Video The Cheetah Girls 2
 Lyrics The Cheetah Girls 2

Spanish-language songs
Spanish children's songs
Traditional children's songs
Spanish folk songs
Spanish-language Christmas carols
18th-century hymns
Lullabies
The Cheetah Girls songs
Valencian music